Godeni is a commune in Argeș County, Muntenia, Romania. It is composed of five villages: Bordeieni, Capu Piscului, Cotești, Godeni and Malu.

Notable people
 Ileana Mălăncioiu

References

Communes in Argeș County
Localities in Muntenia